Affliction is a 2013 urban fantasy novel by American writer Laurell K. Hamilton, the 22nd book in the Anita Blake: Vampire Hunter series. The novel follows Anita Blake and her various lovers as she travels to Colorado and works to uncover a series of murders and infections involving flesh-eating zombies.

Cover art was released to media outlets in October 2012. Affliction was published in July 2013 in hardcover and e-book editions. An unabridged audiobook followed later that year. Affliction’s publication coincided with the twentieth anniversary of the Anita Blake character. In 2013 it reached #5 on the New York Times bestseller list in multiple categories.

Plot 

Anita Blake gets a call from Micah's mother. Micah's father has been bitten by a zombie and is close to death. Anita, Micah, Nathaniel, and her bodyguards fly to Colorado so Micah can see his father and make amends for his estrangement from the family. While in Colorado, Anita discovers that Micah's father is not an isolated case and there have been several deaths and disappearances related to the flesh-eating zombies. Aided by Jean-Claude (who is now the head of a new American vampire council) and Edward, Anita works to uncover the mystery of the flesh-eating zombies in time to save Micah's father.

Main characters 

 Anita Blake
 Jean-Claude
 Edward
 Micah Callahan
 Nathaniel Graison
 Nicky
 Lover of Death

Reception 

Critical reception for Affliction was mostly positive. Publishers Weekly called Hamilton's take on zombies 'invigorating', while Kirkus lamented that much of the book consisted of Anita ‘preaching to the choir’. Several reviews mentioned the series' longevity, including the British Fantasy Society, who noted "The reader needs to feel that the events that take place are sufficiently different from previous novels in the sequence to continue to hold interest" and felt Hamilton had done enough to encourage both new and old readers.

In 2013, Affliction made the New York Times bestseller list in the following categories: #5 in Combined Print and E-book fiction, #5 in Hardcover Fiction, and #5 in E-Book Fiction. In its first week of release, the novel made #4 on the Publishers Weekly Hardcover Fiction list, selling 18,000 copies.

Promotion
Hamilton used a variety of social media tools to promote the book, including a book trailer and a Reddit AMA. She had planned a book tour in support of the novel, but cancelled at the last minute due to illness.

References

External links
 Book trailer for Affliction
 "Why I’m not Touring for Affliction" by Laurell K. Hamilton

2013 American novels
American erotic novels
Anita Blake: Vampire Hunter novels
Low fantasy novels
Novels set in St. Louis
Urban fantasy novels
Berkley Books books
Headline Publishing Group books